Alina Dorofeeva (born 31 August 1998) is a Russian–Azerbaijani footballer who plays as a defender for the Azerbaijan women's national team. She has been a member of the Russia women's national under-17 team.

International goals

See also
List of Azerbaijan women's international footballers

References

External links
 

1998 births
Living people
Sportspeople from Krasnoyarsk
Women's association football defenders
Russian women's footballers
Russian Women's Football Championship players
Azerbaijani women's footballers
Azerbaijan women's international footballers
FC Yenisey Krasnoyarsk players
Russian sportspeople of Azerbaijani descent
Citizens of Azerbaijan through descent